Premier Office Centers LLC dba Premier Workspaces (formerly Premier Business Centers) is a privately held executive suite and office rental company. The company, which was founded in 2002, is doing business Premier Workspaces, one of the largest providers of private offices, meeting rooms rentals, virtual office rental and coworking spaces in the United States. Premier Office Centers is headquartered in Irvine, California and operates with locations in Arizona, Colorado, Washington D.C., Florida, Hawaii, Illinois, Nevada, Ohio, and Texas.

External links

 Official website

References

Real estate services companies of the United States
Real estate companies established in 2002
Companies based in Irvine, California